The twenty-second series of the British reality television programme The Only Way Is Essex began on 25 March 2018 with the cast heading to Barcelona and concluded on 27 May 2018 after ten episodes. The series was confirmed on 21 December 2017, when it was announced that a further two series had been commissioned for 2018. It was also confirmed that the series will only air once a week unlike past series which aired twice a week. Ahead of the series, it was confirmed that a number of cast members had been axed including Chris Clark, Amber Dowding, Vas Morgan, Mike Hassini, Jordan Brooks, Jack Rigden, Taylor Barnett and Ruby Lacey, however Chris and Vas each made brief appearances. As well as this, Mario Falcone and Megan McKenna also confirmed that they wouldn't be returning to the show. This was the final season to feature James Argent. New cast members for this series include Dean Ralph and Jordan Wright, who both previously appeared in the seventh series of Ex on the Beach, as well as Clelia Theodorou and Shelby Tribble. Yazmin's brother Adam Oukhellou also joined the cast midway through the series. Prior to this Adam appeared in the sixth series of Ex on the Beach.

This series focused heavily on the love triangle between Dan, Amber and Clelia, as well as Myles and Courtney's relationship troubles after cheating rumours coming to light and involvement from third parties.

Cast

Episodes

{| class="wikitable plainrowheaders" style="width:100%; background:#fff;"
! style="background:#F3F781;"| Seriesno.
! style="background:#F3F781;"| Episodeno.
! style="background:#F3F781;"| Title
! style="background:#F3F781;"| Original air date
! style="background:#F3F781;"| Duration
! style="background:#F3F781;"| UK viewers

|}

Reception

Ratings

References

The Only Way Is Essex
2018 British television seasons